Visznek is a village in Heves County, Northern Hungary Region, Hungary.

References

Populated places in Heves County